Local elections took place in some parts of England on 4 May 2000.  A third of the seats on each of the Metropolitan Boroughs were elected along with elections in many of the unitary authorities and district councils. There were no elections in Scotland, Wales or Northern Ireland.

Summary of results
Below is a summary of the results of the 2000 local elections.

England

Metropolitan boroughs

Whole council
In 1 English Metropolitan borough council the whole council was up for election.

‡ New ward boundaries

Third of council
In 35 English Metropolitan borough councils, one third of the council was up for election.

Unitary authorities

Whole council
In 11 English Unitary authorities, the whole council was up for election.

‡ New ward boundaries

Third of council
In 16 English Unitary authorities, one third of the council was up for election.

District councils

Whole council
In 9 English district authorities, the whole council was up for election.

‡ New ward boundaries

Third of council
In 80 English district authorities, one third of the council was up for election.

Mayoral elections

References

The local elections and elections for a London mayor and assembly: 4 May 2000. House of Commons Library Research Paper 00/53.

 
2000
2000 elections in the United Kingdom
May 2000 events in the United Kingdom